The Education Channel, also known as "BCPS TV" is a basic cable PEG-TV channel owned and operated by Baltimore County Public Schools, a school district in Maryland. Its offices and production studios are located adjacent to the George Washington Carver Center for Arts and Technology.

The station broadcasts in Baltimore County on Comcast Cable channel 73 and on Verizon channel 34 in Baltimore and Harford counties.

The station's main function is to provide instructional television to schools within the Baltimore County Public School System. It had been a partner with Cable in the Classroom, and also provides educationally-licensed programming from national broadcasters such as The History Channel. The station produces over a dozen original programs, tailored specifically to Baltimore County students and residents, some of which have garnered local Emmy awards.

References
 

Baltimore County Public Schools
Cable television companies of the United States
Baltimore County, Maryland
Television stations in Baltimore